Kilcoo Owen Roes (Irish: Eoghan Rúa Cill Chua) is a Gaelic Athletic Association club from Kilcoo, County Down, Northern Ireland.

They are the most successful club in the Down Senior Football Championship having won it 19 times. The club has also won the Ulster Senior Club Football Championship twice and the All-Ireland Senior Club Football Championship once.

History
Kilcoo GAC was founded in 1906 although there were records of GAA being played there since the 1880s; a proper club wasn't formed until then. The club's first competitive match took place on 13 January 1907 against local team Liatroim (who were the first club formed in the county). The match ended with Kilcoo 0–0 Leitrim 0–5. Kilcoo won their first Senior County Championship in 1917 defeating Killyleagh in the final. The club won the championship in 1922, then followed the glorious "four in a row" 1925,1926,1927,1928, and success came again in 1932,1933 and 1937.

Patience is a virtue, but Kilcoo had to exercise it for 72 years, finally getting the chance to celebrate a Down senior football championship title again in 2009. This launched an unprecedented period of success winning 8 titles in 10 years including a remarkable six-in-a-row between 2012 and 2017.

2009
Kilcoo started their 2009 Down Senior Football Championship campaign with a tricky tie against local rivals Bryansford. After a hard-working display, Kilcoo came out on top winning 2–9 to 1–9. Next up was county champions Mayobridge in a waterlogged Hilltown pitch. Kilcoo went into this match as underdogs and rallied in the last five minutes to come from six points down to win 1–10 to 1–8. The semi-final against Burren was very tense but Kilcoo prevailed on a scoreline of 0–12 to 0–10 with goalkeeper Stephen Kane saving a penalty in the first half. Kilcoo had now reached their first senior final since 1948 and had the chance to bridge a 72-year gap when they last won the title in 1937. Only Loughinisland stood in their way. Kilcoo settled in the second half and came out on top leaving Loughinisland scoreless in the second half also. Final score 2–9 to 1–4. When the final whistle blew the whole Kilcoo crowd invaded the pitch with a sea of black and white in a scene that sparked wild celebrations and that will go down as one of the most memorable moments in the club's history. Captain Gerard McEvoy collected the Frank O'Hare Cup while Anthony Devlin collected the Man of the Match award. The team arrived back home to Kilcoo that evening to heroes welcome in front of a large crowd who assembled in the village. The team then ventured into their first-ever Ulster Championship campaign with a meeting against St. Eunan's of Donegal. After a great team performance, Kilcoo came out on top on a scoreline of 0–13 to 0–9. Their next opponents would be The Loup from Derry. Kilcoo played extremely well but were unable to hold on to the lead and the match ended Loup 1–12 Kilcoo 1–11. In November 2010, Kilcoo Minors retained their title as they overcame Rostrevor. Kilcoo were in a commanding position from the start and even laterally from Rostrevor's Caolan Mooney wasn't enough for Rostrevor. In the end, Kilcoo running out easy winners, to gain back-to-back titles. Kilcoo won the minor championship for the 3rd year in a row beating Warrenpoint 1–12 to 0–10 and the senior team also won the League beating Mayobridge 2–16 to 1–06.

2012
Kilcoo won their second Down county title in four years with a triumph over Mayobridge. 
The final in Newry got off to a dramatic start when Conor Laverty pounced for a goal in the first minute. Kilcoo withstood some late pressure to beat Mayobridge 2–8 to 1-8 and regain the Down Club Championship.

2013
Three injury-time points helped Kilcoo snatch a 0–9 to 0–7 victory to retain their Down Club title in Newry.
Burren led by 0–7 to 0-6 as three minutes of stoppage time was signaled and Darragh O'Hanlon converted a huge 50-meter free to draw the sides level. Paul Devlin then landed the decisive free and added an insurance point from play with the last kick of the game.
Burren captain Dan McCartan was sent-off for a second yellow card offense during a frantic last few minutes. It was Kilcoo's third Down county title in the last five years.

2014
Kilcoo completed a three-in-a-row of Down SFC titles with an emphatic victory over Burren in Newry.
Goals in each half by Ryan Johnston and late ones from Conor Laverty and Donal Kane helped Kilcoo ease to an easy win.

2015
Kilcoo won the Down Senior Club Championship title again with a convincing win against Castlewellan with a final score of Castlewellan 0-11 Kilcoo 3–10.

2016
Kilcoo completed a historic five-in-a-row in Down when they defeated Clonduff 3–11 to 0–9 in the final in Pairc Esler.

2017
Kilcoo clinched a sixth successive Down Football title as they edged out Burren 0–13 to 0–11 at Newry.
Four Donal O'Hare points helped Burren lead 0–7 to 0–6 at half-time and the St Mary's club still led 0–9 to 0-8 five minutes into the second half. However, Kilcoo hit five of the last seven points as Dylan Ward and Paul Devlin both finished with four points.

2018–present
In the 2018 county final, Burren prevented Kilcoo from landing a record seventh straight Down SFC title with a 2–12 to 2–9 win.

Mickey Moran took over as Kilcoo manager ahead of the 2019 season. The Magpies regained their county title thanks to a Dylan Ward goal on the 51st minute to see off a valiant St. Peter's Warrenpoint. In a tight match, Kilcoo emerged victorious by 1–12 to Warrenpoint's 0–14. Kilcoo went on to reach the Ulster club final for the third time. On 1 December 2019, Kilcoo won their first Ulster Club title with a narrow 2-11 to 2–9 win over Naomh Conaill.

In 2021, Kilcoo claimed their third consecutive Down title after defeat of Burren. The Magpies went on to win their second Ulster title after a comfortable win against Derrygonnelly in the final. After getting past St Finbarr's in the semi-final, Kilcoo reached the All-Ireland final for the second time. On 12 February 2022, Kilcoo faced Dublin champions Kilmacud Crokes in the All-Ireland final. Jerome Johnston's late goal in extra-time secured a one-point win and the club's first All-Ireland title.

Honours
All-Ireland Senior Club Football Championship: 1
2021–22
Ulster Senior Club Football Championship: 2
2019, 2021
Down Senior Football Championship: 20
1917, 1922, 1925, 1926, 1927, 1928, 1932, 1933, 1937, 2009, 2012, 2013, 2014, 2015, 2016, 2017, 2019, 2020, 2021, 2022
Down Minor Football Championship: 5
1998, 2009, 2010, 2011, 2019
All-County Football League Division 1 winners: 6
1958, 2003, 2008, 2011, 2013, 2019
All-County Football League Division 3 winners: 1
1984
All-Ireland Under 14 Feile: 1
2006
Down Under 14 Feile: 2
2006, 2007

Kilcoo Senior Football Teams 2019
Down Senior Football Championship Final
Martin McCourt; Darryl Branagan, Niall Branagan, Niall McEvoy; Miceal Rooney, Aidan Branagan, Aaron Branagan; Ryan McEvoy, Dylan Ward; Anthony Morgan, Paul Devlin, Ryan Johnston; Eugene Branagan, Jerome Johnston, Conor Laverty.

Ulster Senior Football Championship Final
M McCourt; N Branagan, Aaron Branagan, N McEvoy; S Johnston, D Ward, R Johnston (0-02); A Morgan, Aidan Branagan (1-00); D Branagan (1-02), P Devlin (0-02, 1f), E Branagan (0-02); R McEvoy (0-01, f), J Johnston (0-01), Conor Laverty (0-01).

Subs: J Clarke for E Branagan (56), F McGreevy for R McEvoy (64).

See also
Down Senior Football Championship
List of Gaelic games clubs in Ireland
Kilcoo, County Down

References

External links
Kilcoo GAC Official club website
Official Down GAA website

Gaelic games clubs in County Down
Gaelic football clubs in County Down